Timanfaya National Park is a Spanish national park in the southwestern part of the island of Lanzarote, in the Canary Islands. It covers parts of the municipalities Tinajo and Yaiza.
The statue El Diablo by César Manrique is its symbol.
It is the only National Park in Spain which is entirely geological. Timanfaya National Park represents a sign of recent and historical volcanism in the Macaronesian Region. The last volcanic eruptions occurred during the 18th century as well as on the 19th century.

Volcanic activity
The greatest recorded eruptions occurred between 1730 and 1736. There is only one active volcano, Timanfaya volcano, after which the park is named.

Ecological value

In 1993, UNESCO designated a Biosphere reserve covering the whole of Lanzarote. The national park is one of the core areas of the biosphere reserve.

Access to the park by the public is strictly regulated to protect the delicate flora and fauna. There are one or two footpaths, and a popular short route where one can visit by camel. There is a public car park from which one can tour the volcanic landscape by coach using a road that is otherwise closed to the public.

References

External links

http://reddeparquesnacionales.mma.es/en/parques/timanfaya/index.htm
More Information and how to get there

Tourist attractions in Lanzarote
National parks of Spain
Biosphere reserves of Spain
Protected areas established in 1974
Protected areas of the Canary Islands
Volcanism of the Canary Islands
1974 establishments in Spain